The Rio de Janeiro Open was a men's tennis tournament was played as Banespa Rio de Janeiro Open from 1989 to 1990 on indoor carpet courts.

Results

Singles

Doubles

See also
 Rio Open – men's ATP Tour tournament (since 2014)

References

External links
 ATP results archive

 
Carpet court tennis tournaments
Indoor tennis tournaments
Grand Prix tennis circuit
International sports competitions in Rio de Janeiro (city)
Defunct tennis tournaments in Brazil